UHF-TV Inc. is a low-powered television broadcaster which relays stations to people in the Willmar, Minnesota area.

UHF-TV's station lineup is as follows:

Note

References

External links
Official Website

Television broadcasting companies of the United States